O 5 was a  patrol submarines of the Royal Netherlands Navy. The ship was built by De Schelde shipyard in Flushing.

Service history
The submarine was ordered on 18 December 1911 and 15 June  1912 the O 5 was  laid down in Flushing at the shipyard of De Schelde . The launch took place on 2 October  1913.

On 20 or 21 August  1914 the ship is commissioned in the navy and stationed in Den Helder.  31 Jan 1914, the ship sinks after the simultaneous opening of an inner and outer torpedo tube doors. O 5 was raised in February 1914 and recommissioned.

During World War I the ship was based in Den Helder. In 1915 the ship sinks again after the simultaneous opening of an inner and outer torpedo tube door. O 5 is raised again and recommissioned.

In 1916 on 9 February one man dies and six others are wounded after a torpedo explosion while moored in Flushing.

In 1935 the O 5 was decommissioned.

External links
Description of ship

References

1913 ships
Ships built in Vlissingen
O 2-class submarines